Amani Doddakere is a village in the southern state of Karnataka, India. It is located in the Anekal taluk of Bangalore Urban district.

References

Villages in Bangalore Urban district